The Sierra Nevada Observatory (OSN; code: J86) is located at Loma de Dilar (2896 m altitude) in the Sierra Nevada mountain range, in the province of Granada, Spain; established in 1981. It is operated and maintained by the Instituto de Astrofísica de Andalucía (Institute of Astrophysics of Andalusia - IAA) and contains two Nasmyth telescopes with apertures of 1.5 and 0.9 metres.

Gallery

See also 
 
 List of largest optical reflecting telescopes

External links 

 Official site

Astronomical observatories in Spain
Buildings and structures in the Province of Granada